Lara González Ortega (born 22 February 1992) is a Spanish handball player for ESBF Besançon and the Spanish national team.

In 2012, she was competing for Spain during the Women's Junior World Championship.

Honours
Champion of the French Championship of first division (D1F) in 2013 and 2014 (Metz)

References

External links

Data on the French League website

Living people
Spanish female handball players
1992 births
Expatriate handball players
Spanish expatriate sportspeople in Denmark
Spanish expatriate sportspeople in France
Spanish expatriate sportspeople in Hungary
Handball players at the 2016 Summer Olympics
Olympic handball players of Spain
Competitors at the 2013 Mediterranean Games
Competitors at the 2018 Mediterranean Games
Mediterranean Games gold medalists for Spain
Siófok KC players
People from Baix Vinalopó
Sportspeople from the Province of Alicante
Mediterranean Games medalists in handball
Handball players at the 2020 Summer Olympics
21st-century Spanish women